Robert "Robbie" Cattanach is an Australian professional footballer who plays for Canberra Olympic.

External links
OzFootball profile

1984 births
Living people
Sportspeople from Canberra
Soccer players from the Australian Capital Territory
Australian soccer players
A-League Men players
South Melbourne FC players
Sydney FC players
Association football forwards